Maureen M. Meikle is an academic historian.

Her 1988 Phd thesis at the University of Edinburgh was titled 'Lairds and gentlemen: A study of the landed families of the Eastern Anglo-Scottish Borders c.1540-1603'.

She is writing a new biography of Anne of Denmark. Like most recent historians she prefers "Anna" for the queen's forename. She was Senior Lecturer in History at the University of Sunderland, and appointed Head of Humanities at Leeds Trinity University in 2009.

Professor Emerita Maureen Meikle gave a public lecture,'Anna of Denmark as Queen of Scots, 1590-1603', at the Patrick Geddes Centre at Riddle's Court in Edinburgh on 30 October 2019.

Selected publications
 'Once a Dane, Always Always a Dane? Queen Anna of Denmark's Foreign Relations and Intercessions as a Queen Consort of Scotland and England, 1588-1619', Sara Ayres, The Court Historian, 24:2 (August 2019), pp. 168-180
The Scottish People, 1490-1625 (Lulu, 2013).  (Paperback);  (E-book).
 Maureen Meikle & Helen M. Payne, 'From Lutheranism to Catholicism: The faith of Anna of Denmark, 1574-1619', Journal of Ecclesiastical History, 64 (2013), pp. 45-69
 'Scottish reactions to the marriage of the Lady Elizabeth, "first dochter of Scotland"', Sara Smart & Mara R. Wade, The Palatine Wedding 1613: Protestant Alliance and Court Festival (Wiesbaden: Harrassowitz in Kommission, 2013), pp. 131–143
 'Anna Of Denmark’s Coronation And Entry Into Edinburgh, 1590: Cultural, Religious And Diplomatic Perspectives', Sixteenth-Century Scotland: Essays in Honour of Michael Lynch (Brill, 2008), pp. 277-294
 A British Frontier? Lairds and Gentlemen in the Eastern Anglo-Scottish Frontier, 1540-1603 (Tuckwell: East Linton, 2004)
 'A meddlesome princess: Anna of Denmark and Scottish court politics 1589–1603, Julian Goodare & Michael Lynch, The Reign of James VI (Tuckwell: East Linton, 2000), pp. 126–140.
 'Holde her at the Oeconomicke rule of the house': Anna of Denmark and Scottish Court of Finances, 1589-1630', Elizabeth Ewan and Maureen M. Meikle, Women in Scotland c.1100-c.1750 (Tuckwell: East Linton, 1999).

References

External links
 Sierra Dye, 'Review of The Scottish People, 1490-1625', Innes Review, 35:2 (November 2015)

Living people
Alumni of the University of Edinburgh
21st-century Scottish historians
Year of birth missing (living people)